

Group A

Head coach:  Sean Flemming

Head coach:  Alexander González

Head coach:  Emilio Umanzor

Head coach: Wilmer Cabrera

Group B

Head coach:  Juan Diego Quesada

Head coach:  Antonio García

Head coach:  José González

Head coach:  Anton Corneal

References

2009 CONCACAF U-17 Championship squads
squads